United States gubernatorial elections were held on November 6, 2018, in 36 states and three territories. These elections formed part of the 2018 United States elections. Other coinciding elections were the 2018 United States Senate elections and the 2018 United States House of Representatives elections.

Many of the states holding gubernatorial elections have term limits which made some multi-term governors ineligible for re-election. Two Democratic governors were term-limited while six incumbent Democratic governors were eligible for re-election. Among Republican governors, twelve were term-limited while eleven could seek re-election. One independent governor was eligible for re-election.

Elections were held in 26 of the 33 states with Republican governors, nine of the 16 states with Democratic governors, one state (Alaska) with an independent governor, two territories (Guam and Northern Mariana Islands) with Republican governors, one territory (U.S. Virgin Islands) with an independent governor, and the District of Columbia with a Democratic mayor. Incumbent state governors running to be reelected included 14 Republicans, five Democrats, and one independent. Territorial incumbents running included one Republican and one independent. The incumbent Democratic mayor of Washington, D.C. also ran for re-election.

Democrats gained control of nine state and territorial governorships that had previously been held by Republicans and an independent. They picked up Republican-held open seats in the states of Kansas, Maine, Michigan, Nevada, and New Mexico, in addition to defeating Republican incumbents in Illinois and Wisconsin and not losing any seats of their own. Additionally, they won the Republican-controlled territory of Guam and the independent-controlled territory of the U.S. Virgin Islands. Republicans won the governorship of Alaska previously held by an independent. Democrats also won the total popular vote for the year's gubernatorial elections for the second year in a row.

Election predictions 
Several sites and individuals publish predictions of competitive seats. These predictions look at factors such as the strength of the incumbent (if the incumbent is running for re-election), the strength of the candidates, and the partisan leanings of the state (reflected in part by the state's Cook Partisan Voting Index rating). The predictions assign ratings to each seat, with the rating indicating the predicted advantage that a party has in winning that seat. Most election predictors use "tossup" to indicate that neither party has an advantage, "lean" to indicate that one party has a slight advantage, "likely" or "favored" to indicate that one party has a significant but not insurmountable advantage and "safe" or "solid" to indicate that one party has a near-certain chance of victory. Some predictions also include a "tilt" rating that indicates that one party has an advantage that is not quite as strong as the "lean" rating would indicate (except Fox News, where "likely" is the highest rating given). Governors whose names are in parentheses are not contesting the election.

{|class="wikitable sortable" style="text-align:center"
|- valign=bottom
! State
! PVI
! Incumbent
! Last race
! Cook
! IE
! Sabato
! RCP
! Daily Kos
! Fox News
! Politico
! 538
! Winner
|-
! Alabama
|  data-sort-value=14 | R+14
|  |  (R)
|  data-sort-value=63.6 | 63.6% R
| 
 | 
| 
| 
| 
| ^
| 
| 
| | Ivey (R)
|-
! Alaska
|  data-sort-value=9 | R+9
|  |  (I)
|  data-sort-value=0 | 48.1% I
| 
 | 
| 
| 
| 
| 
| 
| 
| | Dunleavy (R)
|-
! Arizona
|  data-sort-value=5 | R+5
|  |  (R)
|  data-sort-value=53.4 | 53.4% R
| 
 | 
| 
| 
| 
| ^
| 
| 
| | Ducey (R)
|-
! Arkansas
|  data-sort-value=15 | R+15
|  |  (R)
|  data-sort-value=55.4 | 55.4% R
| 
 | 
| 
| 
| 
| ^
| 
| 
| | Hutchinson (R)
|-
! California
|  data-sort-value=-12 | D+12
|  |  (D) 
|  data-sort-value=-60.0 | 60.0% D
| 
| 
| 
| 
| 
| ^
| 
| 
| | Newsom (D)
|-
! Colorado
|  data-sort-value=-1 | D+1
|  |  (D)
|  data-sort-value=-48.4 | 48.4% D
| 
| 
| 
| 
| 
| 
| 
| 
| | Polis (D)
|-
! Connecticut
|  data-sort-value=-6 | D+6
|  |  (D) 
|  data-sort-value=-50.9 | 50.9% D
| 
| 
| 
| 
| 
| 
| 
| 
| | Lamont (D)
|-
! Florida
|  data-sort-value=2 | R+2
|  |  (R)
|  data-sort-value=48.2 | 48.2% R
| 
| 
| 
| 
| 
| 
| 
| 
|  | DeSantis (R)
|-
! Georgia
|  data-sort-value=5 | R+5
|  |  (R) 
|  data-sort-value=52.8 | 52.8% R
| 
| 
| 
| 
| 
| 
| 
| 
|  | Kemp (R)
|-
! Hawaii
|  data-sort-value=-18 | D+18
|  |  (D)
|  data-sort-value=-49.0 | 49.0% D
| 
| 
| 
| 
| 
| ^
| 
| 
| | Ige (D)
|-
! Idaho
|  data-sort-value=19 | R+19
|  |  (R) 
|  data-sort-value=53.5 | 53.5% R
| 
| 
| 
| 
| 
| ^
| 
| 
| | Little (R)
|-
! Illinois
|  data-sort-value=-7 | D+7
|  |  (R)
|  data-sort-value=50.3 | 50.3% R
| 
| 
| 
| 
| 
| 
| 
| 
| | Pritzker (D)
|-
! Iowa
|  data-sort-value=3 | R+3
|  |  (R)
|  data-sort-value=59.0 | 59.0% R
| 
| 
| 
| 
|  
| 
| 
| 
| | Reynolds (R)
|-
! Kansas
|  data-sort-value=13 | R+13
|  |  (R)
|  data-sort-value=49.8 | 49.8% R
| 
| 
| 
| 
| 
| 
| 
| 
| | Kelly (D)
|-
! Maine
|  data-sort-value=-3 | D+3
|  |  (R) 
|  data-sort-value=48.2 | 48.2% R
| 
| 
| 
| 
| 
| 
| 
| 
| | Mills (D)
|-
! Maryland
|  data-sort-value=-12 | D+12
|  |  (R)
|  data-sort-value=51.0 | 51.0% R
| 
| 
| 
| 
| 
| ^
| 
| 
| | Hogan (R)
|-
! Massachusetts
|  data-sort-value=-12 | D+12
|  |  (R)
|  data-sort-value=48.5 | 48.5% R
| 
| 
| 
| 
| 
| ^
| 
| 
| | Baker (R)
|-
! Michigan
|  data-sort-value=-1 | D+1
|  |  (R) 
|  data-sort-value=50.9 | 50.9% R
| 
| 
| 
| 
| 
| 
| 
| 
| | Whitmer (D)
|-
! Minnesota
|  data-sort-value=-1 | D+1
|  |  (D) 
|  data-sort-value=-50.1 | 50.1% D
| 
| 
| 
| 
| 
| 
| 
| 
| | Walz (D)
|-
! Nebraska
|  data-sort-value=14 | R+14
|  |  (R)
|  data-sort-value=57.2 | 57.2% R
| 
| 
| 
| 
| 
| ^
| 
| 
| | Ricketts (R)
|-
! Nevada
|  data-sort-value=-1 | D+1
|  |  (R) 
|  data-sort-value=70.6 | 70.6% R
| 
| 
| 
| 
| 
| 
| 
| 
| | Sisolak (D)
|-
! New Hampshire
|  data-sort-value=0 | EVEN
|  |  (R)
|  data-sort-value=48.8 | 48.8% R
| 
| 
| 
| 
| 
| 
| 
| 
| | Sununu (R)
|-
! New Mexico
|  data-sort-value=-3 | D+3
|  |  (R) 
|  data-sort-value=57.3 | 57.3% R
| 
| 
| 
| 
| 
| 
| 
| 
| | Grisham (D)
|-
! New York
|  data-sort-value=-12 | D+12
|  |  (D)
|  data-sort-value=-54.2 | 54.2% D
| 
| 
| 
| 
| 
| ^
| 
| 
| | Cuomo (D)
|-
! Ohio
|  data-sort-value=3 | R+3
|  |  (R) 
|  data-sort-value=63.8 | 63.8% R
| 
| 
| 
| 
| 
| 
| 
| 
| | DeWine (R)
|-
! Oklahoma
|  data-sort-value=20 | R+20
|  |  (R) 
|  data-sort-value=55.8 | 55.8% R
| 
| 
| 
| 
| 
| ^
| 
| 
| | Stitt (R)
|-
! Oregon
|  data-sort-value=-5 | D+5
|  |  (D)
|  data-sort-value=-50.9 | 50.9% D
| 
| 
| 
| 
| 
| 
| 
| 
| | Brown (D)
|-
! Pennsylvania
|  data-sort-value=0 | EVEN
|  |  (D)
|  data-sort-value=-54.9 | 54.9% D
| 
| 
| 
| 
| 
| ^
| 
| 
| | Wolf (D)
|-
! Rhode Island
|  data-sort-value=-10 | D+10
|  |  (D)
|  data-sort-value=-40.7 | 40.7% D
| 
| 
| 
| 
| 
| ^
| 
| 
| | Raimondo (D)
|-
! South Carolina
|  data-sort-value=8 | R+8
|  |  (R)
|  data-sort-value=55.9 | 55.9% R
| 
| 
| 
| 
| 
| ^
| 
| 
| | McMaster (R)
|-
! South Dakota
|  data-sort-value=14 | R+14
|  |  (R)
|  data-sort-value=70.5 | 70.5% R
| 
| 
| 
| 
| 
| ^
| 
| 
| | Noem (R)
|-
! Tennessee
|  data-sort-value=14 | R+14
|  |  (R)
|  data-sort-value=70.3 | 70.3% R
| 
| 
| 
| 
| 
| ^
| 
| 
| | Lee (R)
|-
! Texas
|  data-sort-value=8 | R+8
|  |  (R)
|  data-sort-value=59.3 | 59.3% R
| 
| 
| 
| 
| 
| ^
| 
| 
| | Abbott (R)
|-
! Vermont
|  data-sort-value=-15 | D+15
|  |  (R)
|  data-sort-value=52.9 | 52.9% R
| 
| 
| 
| 
| 
| ^
| 
| 
| | Scott (R)
|-
! Wisconsin
|  data-sort-value=0 | EVEN
|  |  (R)
|  data-sort-value=52.3 | 52.3% R
| 
| 
| 
| 
| 
| 
| 
| 
| | Evers (D)
|-
! Wyoming
|  data-sort-value=25 | R+25
|  |  (R)
|  data-sort-value=58.3 | 58.3% R
| 
| 
| 
| 
| 
| ^
| 
| 
| | Gordon (R)
|}
^ Highest rating given

Closest races 
States where the margin of victory was under 1%:
 Florida, 0.4%

States where the margin of victory was under 5%:
 Wisconsin, 1.1%
 Georgia, 1.4%
 Iowa, 2.8%
 Connecticut, 3.2%
 South Dakota, 3.4%
 Ohio, 3.7%
 Nevada, 4.1%
States where the margin of victory was under 10%:
Kansas, 5.0%
 Oregon, 6.4%
Alaska, 7.0%
 New Hampshire, 7.0%
 Maine, 7.7%
 South Carolina, 8.0%
U.S. Virgin Islands, 9.3%
 Michigan, 9.5%

Red denotes states won by Republicans. Blue denotes states won by Democrats.

Race summary

States

Territories and federal district

Alabama

Incumbent Kay Ivey took office upon Robert Bentley's resignation in April 2017.

Ivey won election to a full term.

Alaska

One-term incumbent Bill Walker ran for re-election as an independent but dropped out of the race on October 19 to endorse Mark Begich (several days after Lieutenant Governor Byron Mallott resigned and several weeks before election day).

Former Alaska Senate member Mike Dunleavy won the Republican nomination.

Former U.S. Senator Mark Begich ran uncontested for the Democratic nomination.

Billy Tolein ran for governor on the Libertarian party ticket.

Dunleavy won the election.

Arizona 

One-term incumbent Doug Ducey sought re-election.

Professor David Garcia won the Democratic gubernatorial nomination.

Libertarian candidate for president in 2016 Kevin McCormick declared his candidacy.

Ducey won re-election.

Arkansas 

One-term incumbent Asa Hutchinson ran for re-election.

Jared Henderson, a former state executive director for Teach For America, won the Democratic nomination.

Libertarian Mark West sought his party's nomination.

Hutchinson won re-election.

California 

Two-term consecutive, four-term non-consecutive Governor Jerry Brown was term-limited, as California governors are limited to lifetime service of two terms in office. Brown previously served as governor from 1975 to 1983; California law affects only terms served after 1990.

The Democratic nominee was Lieutenant Governor Gavin Newsom.

The Republican nominee was businessman John H. Cox.

Libertarian candidates included transhumanist activist Zoltan Istvan.

Newsom won election in a landslide, breaking the record for the largest number of votes received in a gubernatorial election.

Colorado 

Two-term Governor John Hickenlooper was term-limited, as Colorado does not allow governors to serve three consecutive terms.

The Democratic nominee was U.S. Representative Jared Polis.

The Republican nominee was Colorado State Treasurer Walker Stapleton.

Polis won the election.

Connecticut 

Two-term Governor Dan Malloy was eligible to seek re-election, but declined to do so.

The Democratic nominee was former selectman from Greenwich Ned Lamont.

Republicans endorsed Mark Boughton, mayor of Danbury, at the statewide nominating convention held on May 11 and 12, 2018, at Foxwoods Resort Casino in Ledyard.  Candidates qualifying to primary at the convention were former First Selectman of Trumbull Tim Herbst and former candidate for Congress Steve Obsitnik. Failing to qualify at the convention to primary were Shelton Mayor Mark Lauretti, former secretary of state candidate Peter Lumaj, state representative Prasad Srinivasan, former U.S. Comptroller General David Walker and Stamford Director of Administration, Mike Handler.

Businessman Bob Stefanowski became the second candidate in the history of Connecticut to petition to be on the primary ballot on June 18, 2018, and the first for a gubernatorial race. Businessman David Stemerman became the third to do so on June 19, 2018. Neither Stefanowski nor Stemerman participated in the statewide convention. Both Lauretti and Handler pledged to conduct a petition drive to get on the August 14, 2018, primary election ballot, but dropped out.

Micah Welintukonis, former vice chair of the Coventry Town Council ran as an independent.

Lamont won the election in a close race.

Florida 

Two-term Governor Rick Scott was term-limited, as Florida does not allow governors to serve three consecutive terms.

U.S. Representative Ron DeSantis won the Republican nomination.

Tallahassee Mayor Andrew Gillum won the Democratic nomination.

Randy Wiseman sought the Libertarian nomination.

DeSantis narrowly won the election in a close race.

Georgia 

Two-term Governor Nathan Deal was term-limited, as Georgia does not allow governors to serve three consecutive terms.

Lieutenant Governor Casey Cagle and Secretary of State Brian Kemp won first and second place in the May 22 Republican primary; Cagle lost the runoff to Kemp on July 24, 2018.

State Representative Stacey Abrams garnered the Democratic nomination outright.

Ted Metz, chair of the Libertarian Party of Georgia, ran unopposed in the Libertarian primary.

Kemp won the election.

Hawaii 

One-term Governor David Ige ran for re-election. Ige took office after defeating previous Governor Neil Abercrombie in the Democratic primary and then winning the general election. Ige was nominated again, after defeating a primary challenge by Congresswoman Colleen Hanabusa.

The Republican nominee was state house minority leader Andria Tupola.

Ige won re-election.

Idaho 

Three-term Governor Butch Otter was eligible to seek re-election, but did not do so.

Lieutenant Governor Brad Little won the Republican nomination.

Paulette Jordan, a former state representative, was nominated in the Democratic primary.

Little won the election.

Illinois 

One-term incumbent Republican Bruce Rauner ran for re-election. State Representative Jeanne Ives also ran for the Republican nomination, but lost narrowly to Rauner.

On the Democratic side, Madison County Regional Superintendent of Schools Bob Daiber, former chairman of the University of Illinois Board of Trustees and member of the Kennedy family Chris Kennedy, State Representative Scott Drury, State Senator Daniel Biss, and venture capitalist J. B. Pritzker all ran for the Democratic nomination. Pritzker, who is related to former United States Secretary of Commerce Penny Pritzker, won the primary, and became one of the wealthiest governors in United States history upon election.

Libertarian candidate Kash Jackson was nominated at the state party convention on March 3. He defeated Matt Scaro and Jon Stewart.

Pritzker won the election in a landslide.

Iowa 

Incumbent Governor Kim Reynolds took office in 2017, upon the resignation of Terry Branstad, following his confirmation as ambassador to China. Reynolds sought election to a full term in 2018.

Former gubernatorial aide John Norris, state Senator Nate Boulton, former state party chairwoman Andy McGuire, SEIU leader Cathy Glasson, attorney Jon Neiderbach, former Iowa City Mayor Ross Wilburn, and businessman Fred Hubbell sought the Democratic nomination, which Hubbell won.

Jake Porter, who was the Libertarian nominee for secretary of state in 2010 and 2014, ran for the Libertarian nomination for governor.

Reynolds won the election.

Kansas 

Jeff Colyer succeeded Sam Brownback in January 2018 after he was confirmed as the United States Ambassador-at-Large for International Religious Freedom.

Secretary of State Kris Kobach defeated Governor Colyer, Kansas Insurance Commissioner Ken Selzer, former state Senator Jim Barnett, and former state Representative Mark Hutton for the Republican nomination.

The Democratic nominee was state Senator Laura Kelly.

Businessman Greg Orman, who finished second in the 2014 U.S. Senate election in Kansas, ran as an Independent.

Kelly won the election.

Maine 

Two-term governor Paul LePage was term-limited, as Maine does not allow governors to serve three consecutive terms. LePage won re-election in a three-way race over Democrat Mike Michaud and independent Eliot Cutler, in 2014. The primary election was June 12, and conducted with ranked choice voting, a system recently implemented and being used for the first time in the 2018 elections in Maine. It was not used in the general election due to an advisory opinion by the Maine Supreme Judicial Court calling its use in general elections for state offices unconstitutional.

Businessman and 2010 independent candidate for governor Shawn Moody won the Republican nomination.

The Democratic nominee was Attorney General Janet Mills.

Two independent candidates qualified for the ballot; State Treasurer Terry Hayes and businessman and newspaper columnist Alan Caron.

Mills won election.

Maryland 

One-term Republican incumbent Larry Hogan ran for re-election.

Former president of the NAACP Benjamin Jealous was the Democratic nominee.

Green Party candidate and entrepreneur Ian Schlakman sought his party's nomination. Libertarian Shawn Quinn was nominated the LP's candidate by convention.

Hogan won re-election.

Massachusetts 

One-term Republican incumbent Charlie Baker ran for re-election.

Former State Secretary of Administration and Finance Jay Gonzalez, environmentalist Bob Massie, and former Newton Mayor Setti Warren have announced their candidacies for the Democratic nomination. Warren withdrew from the race, leaving only Gonzalez and Massie.

Baker won re-election.

Michigan 

Two-term Governor Rick Snyder was term-limited, as Michigan does not allow governors to serve more than two terms.

Attorney General Bill Schuette, Lieutenant Governor Brian Calley, state Senator Patrick Colbeck, and physician Jim Hines were seeking the Republican nomination.

Former state Senate Minority Leader Gretchen Whitmer, former executive director of the Detroit Department of Health and Wellness Promotion Abdul El-Sayed, and businessman Shri Thanedar were seeking the Democratic nomination.

Bill Gelineau and John Tatar were seeking the Libertarian nomination.

Whitmer won the election.

Minnesota 

Two-term Governor Mark Dayton was eligible to seek re-election, but did not do so.

The Democratic-Farmer-Labor nominee was U.S. Representative Tim Walz. The Republican nominee was Hennepin County Commissioner and 2014 gubernatorial nominee Jeff Johnson.

Former Independence Party Governor Jesse Ventura expressed interest in running again, but ultimately declined.

Walz won the election.

Nebraska 

One-term incumbent Pete Ricketts ran for re-election. Former Governor Dave Heineman considered a primary challenge to Ricketts.

State Senator Bob Krist won the Democratic nomination. He intended to create a third party to run, but abandoned this plan.

Ricketts won re-election.

Nevada 

Two-term Governor Brian Sandoval was term-limited, as Nevada does not allow governors to serve more than two terms.

Attorney General Adam Laxalt and State Treasurer Dan Schwartz ran for the Republican nomination, which Laxalt won.

Clark County Commissioners Steve Sisolak and Chris Giunchigliani sought the Democratic nomination, which Sisolak won.

Sisolak won election.

New Hampshire 

Chris Sununu, who was elected in 2016 by a margin of two percent, sought re-election.

Former Portsmouth mayor and 2016 candidate Steve Marchand and former State Senator Molly Kelly ran for the Democratic nomination. Kelly won the nomination.

Jilletta Jarvis sought the Libertarian nomination.

Sununu won re-election.

New Mexico 

Two-term Governor Susana Martinez was term-limited, as New Mexico does not allow governors to serve three consecutive terms.

U.S. Representative Michelle Lujan Grisham faced U.S. Representative Steve Pearce in the general election.

Lujan Grisham won the election.

New York 

Two-term Governor Andrew Cuomo ran for re-election, as New York does not have gubernatorial term limits.

Actress and activist Cynthia Nixon challenged Cuomo for the Democratic Party nomination, but did not win.

Dutchess County Executive Marcus Molinaro was the Republican nominee.

Libertarian Larry Sharpe was the first opponent to declare his candidacy in the race, declaring his candidacy on July 12, 2017 – and won the Libertarian nomination for governor.

Cuomo won re-election.

Ohio 

Two-term Governor John Kasich was term-limited, as Ohio does not allow governors to serve three consecutive terms.

Attorney General Mike DeWine and Lieutenant Governor Mary Taylor ran for the Republican nomination, which DeWine won.

Former U.S. Representative and two-time presidential candidate Dennis Kucinich, Ohio Attorney General and Consumer Financial Protection Bureau director Richard Cordray, and state Senator Joe Schiavoni ran for the Democratic nomination, which was won by Cordray.

Green Party nominee for State House in 2016 Constance Gadell-Newton declared her candidacy.

Filmmaker and comedian Travis Irvine was the Libertarian Party's candidate for governor.

DeWine won the election.

Oklahoma 

Two-term Governor Mary Fallin was term-limited as Oklahoma does not allow governors to serve more than two terms.

Businessman Kevin Stitt advanced to a runoff in the Republican primary, eventually winning.

With only one opponent in the primary, former Attorney General Drew Edmondson won the Democratic nomination outright.

The Libertarian nominee was Chris Powell.

Stitt won the general election.

Oregon 

Kate Brown became governor of Oregon in February 2015 following the resignation of John Kitzhaber. In accordance with Oregon law, a special election was held in 2016, which Brown won. She ran for a full term and won the primary.

State Representative Knute Buehler won the Republican nomination.

Brown won election to a full term.

Pennsylvania 

One-term Governor Tom Wolf was eligible for re-election and was unopposed in the primary.

State Senator Scott Wagner won the Republican nomination.

Ken Krawchuk ran as a Libertarian.

Wolf won re-election.

Rhode Island 

First-term Governor Gina Raimondo ran for re-election.

Raimondo won re-election.

South Carolina 

Henry McMaster succeeded Nikki Haley in January 2017 after she was confirmed as the U.S. Ambassador to the United Nations. McMaster is seeking election to a full term in 2018.

No candidate won a majority in the June 12 Republican primary. Hence, the top two finishers, McMaster and John Warren, competed in a runoff, which McMaster won.

State Representative James E. Smith Jr. won the Democratic primary outright.

McMaster won election to a full term.

South Dakota 

Two-term Governor Dennis Daugaard was term-limited, as South Dakota does not allow governors to serve three consecutive terms.

U.S. Representative Kristi Noem and Billie Sutton, the minority leader of the South Dakota Senate, won the Republican and Democratic nominations, respectively.

Noem won election.

Tennessee 
Two-term Governor Bill Haslam was term-limited, as Tennessee does not allow governors to serve three consecutive terms.

Businessman Bill Lee defeated former Haslam administration official Randy Boyd, U.S. Representative Diane Black, and speaker of the Tennessee House of Representatives Beth Harwell for the Republican nomination.

Former Nashville Mayor Karl Dean defeated House Minority Leader Craig Fitzhugh for the Democratic nomination.

Bill Lee won the election in a landslide.

Texas 
One-term incumbent Greg Abbott ran for re-election.

Lupe Valdez, Dallas County sheriff, announced her bid on December 6, 2017, and, after a runoff primary with Andrew White, entrepreneur and son of Governor Mark White, won the Democratic nomination.

Both Kathie Glass and Kory Watkins sought the Libertarian nomination.

Abbott won re-election.

Vermont 

As the governor of Vermont can serve a two-year term, Phil Scott, who was elected in 2016, ran for re-election. He was nominated in the primary.

Former Vermont Electric Cooperative CEO Christine Hallquist was the Democratic nominee. She was the first transgender woman to be nominated for governor by a major party.

Incumbent Lieutenant Governor David Zuckerman declined to run as a Progressive in the election and instead ran for re-election to that position.

Scott won re-election.

Wisconsin 

Two-term incumbent Scott Walker was eligible for re-election, as Wisconsin does not have gubernatorial term limits.

State schools superintendent Tony Evers won the Democratic nomination.

2016 Libertarian candidate for U.S. Senate Phil Anderson ran as a Libertarian.

Michael White was the candidate for the Green Party.

Evers won the election.

Wyoming 

Two-term Governor Matt Mead was term-limited as Wyoming limits governors to serving for eight years in a sixteen-year period.

The Republican nominee was State Treasurer Mark Gordon.

Former state House Minority leader Mary Throne won the Democratic nomination.

Mark Gordon won the election in a landslide.

Territories and federal district

District of Columbia 

One term incumbent Muriel Bowser ran for re-election with little competition in the primary. She was the Democratic nominee.

Ann Wilcox, a former Board of Education member, won the nomination of the D.C. Statehood Green Party. Dustin Canter, an entrepreneur and fitness businessman, ran as an independent.

Bowser won re-election.

Guam 

The incumbent two-term governor Eddie Baza Calvo was term-limited, after his recent re-election win in 2014, as Guam does not allow governors to serve more than two consecutive terms.

Republican Lt. Governor Ray Tenorio officially declared his bid to succeed Eddie Calvo as the next governor of Guam. Tenorio won the Republican nomination without opposition.

The Democratic nominee was former Territorial Senator Lou Leon Guerrero, who defeated three other politicians in the August 24 primary.

Guerrero won election.

Northern Mariana Islands 

Incumbent Governor Ralph Torres, who took office upon Eloy Inos's death in December 2015, sought election to a full term. Former Governor Juan Babauta also sought the governorship, running as an independent.

Torres won election to a full term.

U.S. Virgin Islands 

Albert Bryan (the Democratic nominee) won the runoff election on November 20, 2018, defeating Independent incumbent Kenneth Mapp.

Notes

References

External links